Trier Arena is an indoor sporting arena located in Trier, Germany.  The capacity of the arena is 5,495 people.

It is currently home to the TBB Trier basketball team.

References

External links 

Indoor arenas in Germany
Buildings and structures in Trier
Sport in Trier
Sports venues in Rhineland-Palatinate